This is a list of foreign football players who played in the Super League and Pro League in the 2022 season. The following players have been born outside Uzbekistan and have not been capped for the Uzbek national team at any level. From season 2022, four per squad is the limit on foreign players, one from Asia and three from the rest of the world.

In bold: players who have played at least one Super League game in the (2022) season, and were still at a club for which they played. This does not include players of a Super League club who did not play a Super League game in the 2022 season.

Details correct as of 12 March 2022

Albania
Rubin Hebaj — Andijon (2023 present)

Argentina 
Gonzalo Ritacco — Qizilqum Zarafshon (2022)

Armenia 
 Khoren Hovhannisyan — Pakhtakor (1989–1991)
 Aram Voskanyan — Lokomotiv Tashkent (2010)
 Romik Khachatryan — Lokomotiv Tashkent (2012—2013)
 Zhora Hovhannisyan — Lokomotiv Tashkent (2012—2013), Pakhtakor (2013—2014)
 Ruslan Koryan — Lokomotiv Tashkent (2015)

Australia 

 David Carney — Bunyodkor (2012)
 Petar Franjic – FC AGMK (2014)
 Rostyn Griffiths — Pakhtakor (2017–2018) 
 Steven Lustica – FC Qizilqum (2019)

Azerbaijan 
 Elshan Gambarov — Navbahor (1998, 2002), Dinamo Samarkand (2000—2002), Mashal (2003) 
 — Mashal (2005–2010)

Belarus 
Oleg Syrokvashko – Navbahor Namangan (1993)
Alexander Petukhov — Andijon
 Aleksei Khaletskiy – Mash'al Mubarek (2010)
 Mikalay Ryndzyuk – Mash'al Mubarek (2010–2011) Dinamo Samarqand (2011) Navbahor   (2012)
Vitaly Rushnitsky – FC Shurtan Guzar (2011–2012)
 Syarhey Krot – Nasaf (2011)
 Vital Panasyuk – Navbahor   (2012)
 Igor Tymonyuk – Mash'al Mubarek (2015, 2017)
 Mikita Bukatkin – Mash'al Mubarek (2015)
 Alyaksey Khaletski – Mash'al Mubarek (2015)
 Terentiy Lutsevich — Neftchi (2017) 
Uladzislaw Kasmynin — AGMK (2017–2018, 2019) FC Qizilqum (2020—2021)
 Dzmitry Kamarowski – FC Neftchi (2017)
Syarhey Kantsavy – FC Neftchi (2017)
Sergey Rusetsky – Buxoro (2018)
 Vasiliy Sovpel — Andijon (2021)
 Pavel Zabelin — Andijon (2021)

Bosnia and Herzegovina
 Aleksandar Brđanin – Mash'al Mubarek (2010) 
 Samir Bekrić — Bunyodkor (2014–2016)
 Nemanja Janičić — Lokomotiv Tashkent (2015–2017)
 Nikola Valentić – Kokand 1912 (2016–2017)
 Haris Dilaver – Nasaf (2020)
 Semir Smajlagić – Nasaf (2022) 
Aleksandar Glišić — Dinamo Samarqand (2022)
Kerim Palić — Metallurg Bekabad (2022 present)

Brazil 

 Anderson — Pakhtakor (1998)
 Everton Cavalcante — Lokomotiv Tashkent (2006—2008), Dinamo Samarkand (2009), Khorezm (2009—2010)
Fabio Pinto — Pakhtakor (2008–2009)
 Luizao — Bunyodkor (2008—2009)
 Rivaldo — Bunyodkor (2008—2010)
 Leomar Rodrigues — Bunyodkor (2009)
 Joao Victor — Bunyodkor (2009—2010)
 Edson Ramos — Bunyodkor (2009—2010)
 Denilson — Bunyodkor (2010)
 Tiago Bezerra  — Pakhtakor (2017—2018)
 Nivaldo – Lokomotiv Tashkent (2018)
 Lucas Oliveria – Surkhon Termez (2019)
 Dougllas Nacsimento – Surkhon Termez (2019)
 Elivelto — Sogdiana Jizzakh (2020)
 Guiherme Carvalho da Silva — Oqtepa (2021)
 Guttiner Costa — Navbahor Namangan (2021)
 Mateus Lima — Nasaf (2022 present)

Bulgaria 
 Nikolay Chipev — Dinamo Samarqand (2015), Buxoro (2015)
Petar Denchev — Navbahor Namangan (2014—2015)
Plamen Dimov — Andijon (2021)
Kamen Hadzhiev — Pakhtakor Tashkent (2022)

Burkina Faso
 Mohamed Kone — Lokomotiv Tashkent (2017)
Faysal Traoré — FC Nasaf (2020 present)

Cape Verde
 Alvin Fortes — AGMK (2021)

Cameroon 
  — Buxoro (1999)
 Frank Kevin Lewa — Shurchi (2006)
 Armand Ken Ella — Mash'al Mubarek (2020)
 Landry Nzimen Chamedjeu — Yangiyer (2021) 
 Jerome Mpasko Etame — Yangiyer (2021), Lokomotiv Tashkent (2022 present) 
 Mbeke Siebatcheu — Yangiyer (2021)
 Rokki Marsiano — Xorazm (2022 present)
 Emmanuel Riccardo — FC Gijduvon (2022 present)

Canada 
Milovan Kapor  – Buxoro (2019–2020)

Chile 
 José Luis Villanueva — Bunyodkor (2008—2009)

Colombia
 Juan Estevan Becerra Ospina — Oqtepa (2021), FC Gijduvon (2021 present)

Croatia 
 Jurica Buljat — Bunyodkor (2016), Pakhtakor (2017)
 Ivor Weitzer — Buxoro (2017)
Edin Junuzović — Buxoro (2020)
Jure Obšivač — Sogdiana Jizzakh (2022 present)

Dominican Republic
Luismi Quezada — Surkhon Termez (2022 present)

Estonia 
 Vladislav Ivanov – Mash'al Mubarek (2015)
Artjom Dmitrijev — Qizilqum Zarafshon (2022—)

Finland 
 Toni Lindberg — Mash'al Mubarek (2012)

France 
  — Lokomotiv Tashkent (2012)

Gabon
Thibault Tchicaya – FC AGMK (2010–2011)

Georgia 
 Giorgi Krasovski — Andijan (2008)
 Vladimir Gochashvili — Andijan (2008)
  – FC Nasaf (2008)
 Zurab Avaliani — Andijan (2008)
  – Mash'al Mubarek (2009)
 Grigol Imedadze – Mash'al Mubarek (2010)
 Kakhi Makharadze  — Pakhtakor (2011—2015), Sogdiana Jizzakh (2019) Lokomotiv Tashkent (2009—2010, 2016—2018, 2020 present)
 Mikheil Makhviladze — FK Khorezm (2010)
  – FK Buxoro (2011–2012, 2013–2014), FC AGMK (2013), Qizilqum Zarafshon (2015–2016)
 Irakli Klimiashvili — Pakhtakor (2011—2012)
 Mikhail Kakaladze – FK Buxoro (2011–2012)
 Levan Mdivnishvili — Andijan (2012)
 Mikheil Alavidze — FC Andijon (2012)
 Giorgi Megreladze – FC Shurtan Guzar (2012–2013)
 Shota Grigalashvili – FC AGMK (2017)
 Elgujja Grigalashvili – Qizilqum Zarafshon (2018–2019), FC AGMK (2019–
 Lasha Totadze – Qizilqum Zarafshon (2019)
 Mate Vatsadze – Qizilqum Zarafshon (2019) FC AGMK (2020 present)
 Vili Isiani – FK Buxoro (2019)
Jaba Lipartia – FK Buxoro (2019–2020)

Germany 
 Julien Oteng-Mensah — FC Shurtan Guzar  (2008, 2011)  
  — Qizilqum (2011—2012)

Ghana
 Richard Sewe – Mash'al Mubarek (2007)
 Jerry Emonkpari – Metalourg Bekabad (2010)
 Kwame Karikari – FC Turon (2021)
 Francis Narh — Bunyodkor (2022 present)

Guinea-Bissau 
 Esmaël Gonçalves — Pakhtakor (2018)

Hungary 
 Péter Vörös — Lokomotiv Tashkent (2009—2010)

Iran
Siavash Hagh Nazari — AGMK (2022 present)

Iraq 
 Haidar Abdul-Razzaq — Andijon (2011)

Israel 
 Gidi Kanyuk — Pakhtakor (2017, 2019)

Italy 
Martin Boakye — Andijon (2021), AGMK (2021 present)

Ivory Coast 
 Taïna Adama Soro - Shurtan (2012)
 Gnohere Krizo — Lokomotiv Tashkent (2017)
 Yacouba Bamba — Kokand 1912 (2020 present)

Japan 
 Naoya Shibamura — Pakhtakor (2012), FK Buxoro (2012—2013)
 Minori Sato — Bunyodkor (2014—2016)
 Tomoki Muramatsu — Mashal (2017)

Kazakhstan 
 – FK Dinamo Samarqand (1991)
 Kairat Utabayev — Pakhtakor (2000—2003), Andijon (2009) 
  – Navbahor (1990–1991) 
 Konstantin Pavlyuchenko – Navbahor (1998) 
Aleksey Negmatov – FK Andijon (2007)
 – Traktor Tashkent (2003–2004)
 Andrey Shumara — FK Buxoro (2006), Andijan (2007)
 Almat Bekbaev — Andijan (2007)
Arsen Tlekhugov – FK Buxoro (2008)
Nurpeys Turekulov — NBU Osiyo (2010)
 — Mash'al Mubarek(2010)
Ilya Fomitchev — Mash'al Mubarek (2012) 
Valery Fomichev – FC AGMK (2015)
Aleksandr Kirov — Kokand 1912 (2015)
Kirill Pasichnik — FC Buxoro (2017) 
Vladislav Vasilyev — Andijon (2021 present)

Kyrgyzstan 
  – MHSK Tashkent (1996)
  – MHSK Tashkent (1996)
 – FK Atlaschi (1995–1996) Kosonsoy (1997)
  – Neftchi Fergana (1992) FK Andijon (1994–1996), Qizilqum Zarafshon (1997–1998), MHSK Tashkent (1998)
 Karim Izrailov — Mashal (2010), Bunyodkor (2011), Dinamo Samarkand (2011), Mashal (2012)
 Maksim Agapov – Xorazm FK Urganch (2012)
 Emil Kenzhesariyev – Bunyodkor (2011-2012)
Farhat Musabekov - FC AGMK (2017)
Pavel Matyash — FC AGMK (2018)
Akhlidin Israilov - Andijon (2019)
 Sherzod Shakirov - Sogdiana (2019)

Latvia 
 Maksims Danilovs — Qizilqum Zarafshon (2008)
 Pāvels Davidovs — Mashal (2011)
 Andrejs Perepļotkins — FC Nasaf (2011—2012)

Lithuania 
 Virginijus Baltušnikas — Pakhtakor (1991)
 Gintaras Kvitkauskas — Pakhtakor (1991)
 Tadas Grazhiunas — FK Buxoro (2011), FC Andijon (2012) 
 Pavelas Leusas — Qizilqum Zarafshon (2011)
 Arturas Fomenka — FK Andijon (2008), FC AGMK (2008—2010), Sogdiana Jizzakh (2011), FK Buxoro (2011), Navbahor (2012), Lokomotiv Tashkent (2012), FC Shurtan Guzar (2013)
 Egidijus Majus — FK Dinamo Samarqand (2012)
Gediminas Paulauskas – FK Dinamo Samarqand (2014)
Darvydas Šernas – Sogdiana Jizzakh (2018)

Macedonia 
 Stevica Ristić — Bunyodkor (2010)
 Dušhan Savić — Pakhakor (2011)
 Xhelil Asani – Mash'al Mubarek (2018)
 Bojan Najdenov — Navbahor Namangan (2021)

Malaysia 
 Diego — FC Chimchiqkol (2008), FC Sergeli (2009)

Moldova 
Iurie Scala – Neftchi Fergana (1988)
Alexei Scala – Neftchi Fergana  (1988)
Maksim Chebotar – FC Nasaf (2008)
 Alexandru Popovici – FK Andijon (2011)
Maxim Antoniuc – FC Buxoro (2015)
 Oleg Bejenar – FC Nasaf (2000)
 Nikolay Minchev – FC Nasaf (2009)
Gheorghe Boghiu – FC Nasaf (2010)
 Iulian Bursuc — FC Nasaf (2009)
 Anatolie Ostap — Mash'al Mubarek (2010)
 Eduard Tomaşcov — Sogdiana Jizzakh (2011)
Constantin Mandrîcenco – FC Dinamo Samarqand (2015)
 Adrian Cașcaval – Neftchi Fergana (2015), FC AGMK (2015)
Alexandru Melenciuc – Sogdiana Jizzakh (2011, 2013–2014), Navbahor Namangan (2015–2016)
Alexei Casian – FK Andijon (2011)
Denis Romanenco – Dinamo Samarqand (2010), Navbahor Namangan (2011–2012)
 Alexandru Onica – Lokomotiv Tashkent (2013), Neftchi Fergana (2014)
 Vitalie Plămădeală — FC Buxoro (2014–2015)
 Andrei Cojocari — Lokomotiv (2014)
Ghenadie Moșneaga – FK Andijon (2015)
Denis Ilescu – Andijon (2016–2017)
 Vadim Cemirtan — FC Buxoro (2016, 2018), FC AGMK (2018), FC Bunyodkor (2017)
 Maxim Iurcu — Qizilqum Zarafshon (2017)
Radu Rogac – FC Dinamo Samarqand (2017)
 Artiom Litviacov — FC Andijon (2020)

Montenegro 
Bojan Kaljević — Metallurg Bekabad (2008–2010, 2011–2012), Bunyodkor (2010)
Darko Marković — FC Pakhtakor (2018-2011)
Milan Nikolić — FC Pakhtakor Tashkent (2009)
Predrag Vujović – FC Shurtan Guzar (2011), FK Buxoro (2014), FC Andijon (2015)
Ivan Bošković — Nasaf Qarshi (2011—2012)
Sanibal Orahovac — FC Pakhtakor Tashkent (2012)
 Damir Kojašević — Lokomotiv Tashkent (2015)
Dejan Boljević — Nasaf (2016)
 Slaven Stjepanović — FC Lokomotiv (2016) 
 Adnan Orahovac — FC Pakhtakor (2015-2017) Dinamo Samarqand (2017)
 Marko Simić — Pakhtakor Tashkent (2017–2019)
 Darko Nikač — Navbahor Namangan (2018)
 Ivan Fatić — Buxoro (2019)
 Igor Zonjić — AGMK (2019—2020)
 Slavko Damjanović — Lokomotiv Tashkent (2020)
 Oliver Sarkic — Pakhtakor Tashkent (2022 present) 
 Goran Milojko — Andijon (2022 present)
 Bogdan Milić — Andijon (2022 present)
 Ilija Martinović — Pakhtakor Tashkent (2022 present)

Namibia 
 McCartney Naweseb – Qizilqum Zarafshon (2020)

Nicaragua 
 Ariagner Smith – Qizilqum Zarafshon (2019), FC Lokomotiv (2019)

Niger 
 Olivier Bonnes – Kokand 1912 (2019)

Nigeria 
 Patrick Agbo — Navbahor (2005—2006, 2011), Quruvchi (2007), Dinamo Samarkand (2008), Shurtan (2009—2010, 2011—2012)
 Uche Iheruome — Pakhtakor (2005—2010), Shurtan (2008) 
 Eric Abanda — FC Oqtepa  (2006)
 Okafor Obinna — Lokomotiv Tashkent  (2006)
 Wilson Rapposo — Lokomotiv Tashkent  (2007)
 Andre Camara Kiryuxin — FC Oqtepa  (2007)
 David Oniya — Dinamo Samarkand (2007—2011), Bunyodkor (2011), Soghdiana (2012), Bukhara (2012—2013), Neftchi Ferghana (2014)
 Nsofor — FK Buxoro (2008), FC Andijon (2009)
 Chidi Ebuzoemi — Sogdiana Jizzakh  (2009)
 Martin Izokho — Dinamo, FC Andijon (2008-2010)
Samuel Akanji — Shurtan (2008—2009) Qizilqum (2009—2010)
 Emmanuel Obide Okechukwu — Qizilqum (2012)
Alex Ojiaka Navbahor (2012)
Olabiran Muyiwa – Lokomotiv Tashkent  (2017) 
Ibrahim Tomiwa — FC Oqtepa (2020), FC Qizilqum (2020 present) Bunyodkor (2021 present)
 Ifeanyi Ifeanyi — Mash'al Mubarek (2020—2021)
 Michael Okoro Ibe — FK Andijon (2020), Mash'al Mubarek (2020—2021)
 Emmanuel Ariwachukwu — FK Andijon (2020)
Long Ji Song — FC Oqtepa (2021),  FC Gijduvon (2021 present)
Samuel Opeh  — Oqtepa (2021), Lokomotiv Tashkent (2021 present)
 Ukeme Williams — Mash'al Mubarek (2021)
 Godwin Chika Okwara — Mash'al Mubarek (2021)
 Samuel Chigozie Ononiwu — Mash'al Mubarek (2021)
 Paul Komolafe — Qizilqum Zarafshon (2022 present)
 Ojo Moses — Mash'al Mubarek (2022 present)

Poland 
 Przemysław Banaszak — Pakhtakor Tashkent (2022 present)

Romania 
 Petrica Ungureanu — Shurtan (2008)
 Bogdan Hauși — FK Buxoro (2015)

Russia 
 Gleb Panfyorov – Dinamo Samarqand (1992)
 Vyacheslav Klochkov – Navbahor Namangan (1992)
 Sergei Ivanov – Navbahor Namangan (1992)
 Andrei Zaikin — Neftchi Ferghana (1992)
 Albert Tsarayev — Neftchi Ferghana (1992—1993)
 Dmitri Batynkov – Navbahor Namangan (1995–1997)
 Dmitry Bystrov – Navbahor Namangan (1995–1997)
 Andrey Afanasyev — Navbahor (1997)
 Nikolai Kashentsev – FK Buxoro (2006–2007)
 Grigori Melikov – Lokomotiv Tashkent (2006), FK Buxoro (2007, 2008–2009)
 Andrei Podolyanchik – FK Buxoro (2007)
 Aleksey Abdukhalikov – FK Buxoro (2007)
 Sergey Kuznetsov — FK Buxoro (2008), Mash'al Mubarek (2008)
 Yuriy Shelenkov – Navbahor Namangan (2009)
 Oleg Yezhurov — FK Andijan (2009)
 Aleksandr Filimonov – Lokomotiv Tashkent (2009–2010)
 Evgeniy Gogol — Lokomotiv Tashkent (2010, 2013—2014), Almalyk (2011—2013, 2015—2017)
 Vladimir Chekunov — Navbahor (2012)
 Andrey Usachev — Qizilqum (2012)
 Alan Kusov — Lokomotiv Tashkent (2013)
 Aleksandr Kovalyov – Metalourg Bekabad (2013)
 Igor Golban — Kokand 1912 (2014—2015), Navbahor (2016, 2019 present) Nasaf (2016)
 Vladimir Argun — Kokand 1912 (2015)
 Nikolai Pogrebnyak – Lokomotiv (2018)
 Vyacheslav Sushkin — FC Neftchi Fergana (2018)
Andrei Shipilov — Metalourg Bekabad (2018 present)
 Vlad Larinov – Buxoro (2018)
 Yevgeni Cheremisin —Qizilqum (2018–2019)
Ivan Solovyov – Navbahor (2019 present)
 Artyom Kulesha – Buxoro (2019)
 Dmitriy Ostrovskiy — FC Bunyodkor (2019)
 Sergei Tumasyan — Metalourg Bekabad (2019)
Ruslan Margiev — Qizilqum Zarafshon (2019 present)
 Kirill Pogrebnyak — Lokomotiv Tashkent (2020 present)
 Oleg Tolmasov — Qizilqum Zarafshon (2020 present)
 Ruslan Bolov – Navbahor (2020 present)
 Pavel Golyshev – Navbahor (2020 present)

Serbia 
 Miljan Priović – Traktor Tashkent (2004)
 Jelko Joksimović – Traktor Tashkent (2004)
 Vladica Ćurčić – Traktor Tashkent (2004)
 Bojan Ilić – FC Andijon (2009)
 Bojan Miladinović – Pakhtakor (2009–2014)
 Igor Petković – Mash'al Mubarek (2010–2012), FC AGMK (2012–2014)
 Milorad Janjuš – Pakhtakor (2010)
 Đorđe Ivelja – FC Nasaf (2010)
 Aleksandar Petrović – FC Nasaf (2010)
 Nikola Mitrović – FC Chinoz (2010)
 Miloš Trifunović – FC Bunyodkor (2010–2011), FC AGMK (2018)
 Vladislav Virić – Mash'al Mubarek (2010)
 Saša Đorđević – FC Bunyodkor (2011)
 Uroš Milosavljević – FC Bunyodkor (2011)
 Predrag Vujović – FC Shurtan Guzar (2011), FK Buxoro (2014), FC Andijon (2015)
 Bojan Mališić – Nasaf Qarshi (2011–2012)
 Milorad Resanović – Mash'al Mubarek (2012)
 Slavoljub Đorđević – FC Bunyodkor (2012)
 Marko Blažić – FC Bunyodkor (2013)
 Aleksandar Alempijević – FC AGMK (2014), FC Bunyodkor (2016)
 Nemanja Jovanović – FC AGMK (2016), FC Andijon (2016), Qizilqum Zarafshon (2017–2018)
 Darko Stanojević – FC AGMK (2016), Navbahor Namangan (2017–2018), Surkhon Termez (2019–2020), Neftchi Fergana (2021 present) 
 Ognjen Krasić – FC Nasaf (2016)
 Dragan Ćeran – FC Nasaf (2016–2018) Pakhtakor Tashkent (2018 present)
 Dušan Mićić – Bunyodkor (2017)
 Darko Gojković – Kokand 1912 (2016–2017)
 Tomislav Pajović – Navbahor Namangan (2017–2018)
 Nenad Injac – Navbahor Namangan (2017–2018) 
Filip Rajevac – Kokand 1912 (2017, 2020), Bunyodkor (2018), PFC Lokomotiv Tashkent (2019)
 Milan Spremo – Kokand 1912 (2018)
 Marko Klisura – FK Buxoro (2018, 2019)
 Nikola Milinković – Sogdiana Jizzakh (2018–2019)
 Miloš Simonović – Sogdiana Jizzakh (2018)
 Marko Milić - Kokand 1912 (2018), (2019), FK Buxoro (2021)
 Igor Jelić – FC AGMK (2017), PFC Lokomotiv Tashkent (2018–2019)
 Jovan Đokić – FC AGMK (2018, 2020–2021)  FC Lokomotiv (2019), Navbahor (2022 present)
 Vladimir Bubanja – FC AGMK (2018), Surkhon Termez (2019–2020, 2021) Andijon (2022 present) 
 Slavko Lukić – FC Nasaf (2018), Navbahor (2019), Kokand 1912 (2021 present)
 Milan Mitrović – Sogdiana Jizzakh (2018 present)
 Radosav Aleksić – FC Andijon (2019)
 Marko Zoćević – FC AGMK (2019)
 Miroljub Kostić – FC AGMK (2019)
 Marko Kolaković – Sogdiana Jizzakh (2020 present)
 Ivan Josović – Kokand 1912 (2020 present)
Marko Stanojević – Nasaf (2020 present)
 Nikola Tasić – Navbahor (2021)
 Marko Putinčanin – Navbahor (2021)
 Slaviša Stojanović – Navbahor (2021)
 Bojan Ciger – Navbahor (2021 present)
 Andrija Kaludjerović – Nasaf (2021)
 Bojan Matić – Pakhtakor Tashkent (2021)
 Luka Čermelj – Sogdiana Jizzakh (2021 present)
 Darko Stanojević – Neftchi Fergana (2021), Sogdiana Jizzakh (2021) 
 Siniša Babić – Turon (2021)
 Dajan Ponjević – Turon (2021)
 Marko Obradović – Neftchi Fergana (2021)
 Aleksandar Ješić – Neftchi Fergana (2021 present)
 Marko Šarić – Neftchi Fergana (2022 present)
 Danijel Stojković – Neftchi Fergana (2022 present)
 Miroslav Marković – Surkhon Termez (2022 present)
 Aleksandar Stanisavljević – Qizilqum Zarafshon (2022 present)
 Zoran Marušić – Navbahor (2022 present)
 Dimitrije Pobulić – Bunyodkor (2022 present)
 Mihailo Jovanović – Dinamo Samarqand (2022 present)
 Miloje Preković – Dinamo Samarqand (2022 present)

Slovakia 
 Marián Dirnbach — FC Nasaf (2008)
 Jan Kozak — FC Bunyodkor (2012)

Slovenia 
 Rok Roj — FC Nasaf (2015—2016)

Spain 
 Carles Coto — FC Bunyodkor (2014)
Diego Bardanca  — Lokomotiv Tashkent (2021)
Sergio Rodríguez — Surkhon Termez (2022)
Javi Jiménez — Surkhon Termez (2022)
Rubén Sánchez — Surkhon Termez (2022), AGMK (2023 present)
Manel Martínez — Surkhon Termez (2022)

South Korea 
 Choi Hyun-yeon — Navbahor (2016)
 Cho Seok-jae — Lokomotiv Tashkent (2018)
Kim Dong-hee — Soghdiana (2018)
 Kim Bo-yong — FC Turon (2021—2022)

Swaziland 
 Sandile Hlatjwako – Nasaf Qarshi (2008)

Switzerland 
 Eren Derdiyok — Pakhtakor Tashkent (2020 present)

Tajikistan 
 Valeriy Gorbach — Bukhara (1991)
 Tokhirjon Muminov — FC Andijon (1996—1998, 2000—2002)
 Akmal Kholmatov — Neftchi Ferghana (1996—2008, 2014—2016), Pakhtakor  (2008—2010), Lokomotiv Tashkent (2012—2014), Shurtan (2017), Andijan (2017)
 Alisher Tuychiev — Yangiyer (1996, 1999), Nasaf (1997-1999), Guliston (2000), Mashal (2002), Metallurg Bekabad (2008—2009)
 Shuhrat Jabborov — Soghdiana (1998—1999), Dinamo Samarkand (2000—2002, 2003—2004)
 Mukhsin Mukhamadiev — Bukhara (1999), Dinamo Samarkand (2000—2001)
 Farhod Tohirov — Andijan (2012)
 Umedzhon Sharipov — Mash'al Mubarek (2017)
 Jahongir Aliev — Nasaf (2018)
 Zoir Juraboev – Metallurg Bekabad (2018)
 Fatkhullo Fatkhuloev — FK Buxoro (2019)
 Amirbek Juraboev — Navbahor Namangan (2019–2020)
 Davron Ergashev — FC Bunyodkor (2020 present)

Tunisia 
 Chaker Zouaghi — FC AGMK (2014), Bunyodkor (2015—2016)
Mohamad Salem — AGMK (2023 present)

Trinidad and Tobago 
 Weslie John – FC Andijon (2020)

Turkmenistan 
Kakha Gogoladze – FC Nasaf (1998)
 Artyom Nikitenko  - Olmaliq FK
Amir Gurbani - FK Buxoro
Maksim Kazankov- - Lokomotiv Tashkent
Maksim Belyh – Navbahor Namangan
 Konstantin Sosenko — Pakhtakor (2000—2001)
 Didar Hajiyev — Navbahor (2005—2009), Nasaf (2010)
 Guwançmuhammet Öwekow – Navbahor (2005–2006)
 Dayanklych Orazov — Neftchi Ferghana (2006), Soghdiana (2006, 2008)
 Artur Gevorkyan — Shurtan (2006—2009), Pakhtakor (2010), Nasaf (2011—2016), Lokomotiv Tashkent (2016), Qizilqum(2017-2018)
 Murat Hamrayev — Dinamo Samarkand (2007—2008), Almalyk (2009, 2010—2011) 
 Nazar Choliyev — Almalyk (2008)
 Bahtiýar Hojaahmedow — Bukhara (2010)
 Pavel Harchik — Qizilqum (2011), Almalyk (2012)
 Alik Haydarov — Mashal (2011—2013)
 Maksatmurat Shamuradov — Almalyk (2013—2014)
 Elman Tagayev — Andijan (2016) Navbahor Namangan  (2019)
 Arslanmyrat Amanow – FC AGMK (2015–2016, 2020 present) FC Buxoro (2018) Lokomotiv (2019)
 Selim Nurmyradow  — FC Bunyodkor (2020 present)
 Abdy Bäşimow — Qizilqum Zarafshon (2020)
 Wezirgeldi Ylýasow — Qizilqum Zarafshon (2020)
Didar Durdyýew — FK Mash'al Mubarek (2020)

Ukraine 
Sefer Alibaev — Navbahor Namangan (1988—1991), Traktor Tashkent (1996), FK Samarqand-Dinamo (1997)
 Yuriy Yaroshenko — Navbahor Namangan (1993)
Igor Taran — FC Dustlik (1998)
Vladislav Lyutiy — FC Pakhtakor Tashkent (2001)
Sergey Mayborada — FC Pakhtakor Tashkent (2001)
 Aleksandr Kundenok — Navbahor Namangan (2003)
Serhiy Yesin — Navbahor Namangan (2003)
 Andrey Oparin — Navbahor Namangan (2004)
 Oleksandr Tkachuk — Qizilqum Zarafshon (2008—2009) 
 Mykola Pavlenko — FC Nasaf (2008—2009) 
 Anatoliy Matkevych — FC Nasaf  (2008) 
 Oleh Mochulyak — FK Buxoro (2008) 
 Nikolay Guryanov – Lokomotiv Tashkent (2010)
 Aleksandr Pozdeev — FC AGMK (2010)
 Denys Yershov — FC AGMK (2010)
 Anton Lysyuk — FC Qizilqum (2010)
 Oleksandr Dyndikov — FC AGMK (2010), Dinamo (2010)
 Serhiy Datsenko — Dinamo (2010)
Andrei Jakovlev — FC Nasaf (2010)
Dmytro Kozachenko — FC Nasaf (2010)
Andrei Khodykin — Mash'al Mubarek (2011)
 Andrey Melnichuk — Qizilqum Zarafshon (2010—2011), FK Samarqand-Dinamo (2011—2015)
 Sergey Litovchenko — Lokomotiv Tashkent (2010)
 Andriy Yakovlyev — FC Nasaf (2010)
 Oleksiy Khramtsov — Navbahor Namangan (2010)
 Yuriy Tselykh — Navbahor Namangan (2010), FK Andijan (2011)
 Dmytro Kolodin — Qizilqum Zarafshon (2010)
 Roman Pasichnichenko —Qizilqum Zarafshon (2011)
 Dmytro Kozachenko — FC Nasaf (2011)
 Oleksandr Polovkov – FK Andijan (2012)
 Andrey Yerokhin  – FK Samarqand-Dinamo (2012)
 Andrey Sirotyuk – Metalourg Bekabad   (2012)
 Oleksandar Tarasenko – FK Buxoro (2012)
 Ihor Tymchenko  — Lokomotiv Tashkent (2013)
 Volodymyr Kilikevych — FK Samarqand-Dinamo (2013), FK Buxoro (2013)
 Oleksandr Pyschur – FC Bunyodkor (2013—2014), Navbahor Namangan (2016), FC Shurtan Guzar (2017)
 Vyacheslav Shevchenko — Lokomotiv Tashkent (2014), Qizilqum Zarafshon (2015—2017)
 Ruslan Kachur — Navbahor Namangan (2014)
 Serhiy Symonenko — FC Bunyodkor (2014)
 Oleksandr Kablash — Sogdiana Jizzakh (2014), Navbahor Namangan (2015)
 Yaroslav Martynyuk — FC AGMK (2016)
 Andriy Derkach – Mash'al Mubarek (2016), Qizilqum (2017)
 Vladyslav Pavlenko – Mash'al Mubarek (2017)
 Vitaliy Mirnyi – Neftchi Fergana (2018), FC Andijon (2019)
Yevhen Chumak – FC Bunyodkor (2019), Metallurg Bekabad (2020 present), Dinamo Samarqand (2022 present) 
 Oleksandr Kasyan – Navbahor (2019), Surkhon Termez (2020 present), FC AGMK (2022 present) 
 Volodymyr Bayenko – FC Buxoro (2017), (2019)
 Dmytro Zozulya – FC Andijon (2020)
 Artem Baranovskyi – FC Buxoro (2020)
 Denys Vasilyev — Mash'al Mubarek (2020)
 Mykhaylo Udod – Dinamo Samarqand (2021) 
 Oleh Marchuk – Dinamo Samarqand (2021), FK Buxoro (2022 present)
 Dmytro Sydorenko – Dinamo Samarqand (2021), FK Buxoro (2022 present)
 Oleksiy Larin — Pakhtakor Tashkent (2022 present)
 Andriy Mishchenko — AGMK (2022 present)
 Rizvan Ablitarov — FK Buxoro (2022 present)

United States 
 Graham Smith – FC AGMK (2016–2017)

Notes

See also
2022 Uzbekistan Super League
2022 Uzbekistan Pro League

References 

ПФЛ УЗБЕКИСТАН

External links 
 Uzbekistan Super League

 
Uzbekistan
foreign
Association football player non-biographical articles
Football in Uzbekistan